Circopetes is a monotypic moth genus in the family Geometridae erected by Louis Beethoven Prout in 1910. Its only species, Circopetes obtusata, the grey twisted moth, was first described by Francis Walker in 1860. It is found in mainland Australia.

The wingspan is about 60 mm.

The larvae feed on Eucalyptus nicholii.

References

Oenochrominae
Monotypic moth genera